Sheridan Crane is a fictional character on the NBC/DirecTV soap opera Passions. She was portrayed by McKenzie Westmore since the series began in 1999. She was briefly portrayed by Shannon Sturges when Westmore was out sick in 2005. Additionally, she was briefly portrayed by Kam Heskin in 2006, when Westmore was out on maternity leave, and again in 2008, while Westmore was out sick. In early flashback sequences, Sheridan at age 12 was portrayed by Sara Paxton. When Sheridan's history was retconned and her flashback sequence age was downgraded from 12 to 6, she was played by Rylee Fansler. She is often seen as a "poor little rich girl" but her love for Luis Lopez-Fitzgerald made her true emotions rise. Sheridan was inherently a good person for much of the series, until the final year when she became a villain.

Character backstory
Sheridan is the daughter of Alistair Crane, a world-famous billionaire (who secretly built up his empire through a network of crime) and Katherine Crane. Born several decades into the marriage of her parents, Sheridan was generally considered an unwanted child by her father, Alistair, and she was ignored in favor of her older brother, Julian Crane.

When Sheridan was a young girl, she found a man, Martin Fitzgerald, covered with a bloody sheet in her family's living room. It eventually turned out that Martin defended Sheridan's mother, Katherine, who was physically and sexually abused by Sheridan's father, Alistair, who had stabbed Martin. Due to Sheridan's vague memories as a little girl and the family's concealment of the whole ordeal, the event became a mystery and deeply traumatized Sheridan, causing her to frequently sleepwalk, have mental breakdowns and nightmares since her youth. Shortly after, Sheridan and Julian were also informed by their father that their missing mother was "dead".

As a result of her uncontrollable fits, Sheridan was sent away to Europe by her father. As Sheridan grew up, she became an arrogant, spoiled and self-absorbed socialite much like Julian. She hung out with the rich and powerful and even claimed friendship with Diana, Princess of Wales of the British Royal family. Sheridan also had a string of torrid love affairs, all of which ended with Sheridan discovering that her boyfriends were only interested in her due to her wealth.

Storylines 
At the start of the Passions, Sheridan ends her engagement with Jean-Luc Moulin after discovering that he is after the Crane riches. Returning to her hometown of Harmony, Sheridan is pulled over by a police officer, Luis Lopez-Fitzgerald for speeding. At first he only wants to give her a speeding ticket, but when Sheridan tries to bribe her way out of said ticket, Luis arrests her for bribing a police officer. Upon learning of her last name, Luis confesses his disdain for the Crane family, suspecting they are linked to the disappearance of his father, Martin. Sheridan is ultimately sentenced to six months of community service at the children's center and is supervised by Luis, who wants to ensure Sheridan does not bribe her way out of performing her duty. While serving her time there, and amidst a brief fling with police chief Sam Bennett's younger brother, Hank Bennett, Sheridan and Luis develop a complex love-hate relationship, often engaging in various arguments and acting competitively with each other.

Unbeknownst to Sheridan, Jean-Luc has been a part of a French drug cartel and she had inadvertently learned the identities of his business partners.  This made her a liability to their operation, and she became a target once she left Paris. The FBI is brought in to protect Sheridan and Luis is appointed as her private bodyguard to protect her from hired henchmen sent after her. Both Sheridan and Luis object to the arrangement at first, but Luis decides to put his job ahead of his personal feelings towards Sheridan, which are now blossoming into love. Sheridan cannot do the same and often puts herself in dangerous situations while trying to distance herself from Luis.

Just as the two confess their growing attraction towards the other, Sheridan is shot in cold blood. She is taken away by an ambulance and Luis is told that is dead. In truth, the attempt on her life was faked to allow Moulin to think Sheridan was dead. Sheridan flees to Paris where she tries to convince Moulin to drop his vendetta against her. Moulin ultimately dies in a car explosion meant for Sheridan. Several months later, around Christmas time, Sheridan returns to Harmony and reunites with Luis, who asks Sheridan to marry him.

Sheridan's father, Alistair Crane, does not approve of her relationship with Luis. By this point, Sheridan and Luis have realized that the man who Sheridan found dying in her childhood home was Luis's father. Fearing that the two will expose Alistair's vast number of illegal activities in their investigation, Alistair and Sheridan's brother Julian hire an actor (disguised as Luis) to trick Sheridan into thinking Luis is only using her for her money. When this scheme fails, Alistair decides to murder Sheridan. He laces her wedding band with a quick-acting poison activated by her DNA. However, this plan ultimately fails when their wedding is postponed. Sheridan and Luis plan to have a double wedding with her former nephew Ethan Winthrop, and Luis's younger sister Theresa. With Ethan and Theresa set to be wed first, the entire ceremony is derailed due to the actions of Ethan's ex-girlfriend Gwen and Ethan's mother, Ivy Winthrop, who crashes her car into the church. The two decide to postpone their wedding in light of Ethan and Theresa having their wedding day ruined, but go onto their honeymoon anyway.

While on their honeymoon, Alistair rigs a boat they rent with TNT and detonates it. Sheridan was on board when this happens. However, there is no body to be found, causing Alistair to take the extreme action of cremating a dummy, in order to make everyone believe Sheridan was dead and stop looking for her.

Sheridan's body washes ashore on a nearby island and is resurrected via the prayers of the white witches Grace Bennett and Charity Standish. Sheridan is found by a fisherman named Brian, having only vague memories of a past life she shared with Luis on the Titanic. Sheridan, now going by the name "Diana", is taken to live with Brian at the island B&B where he resides. There, the pair fall in love, but Brian is hesitant about helping Sheridan recover her memories, due to fear that she will abandon him. Along the way, Sheridan discovers that Brian is estranged from his own family, who he has not seen since he was 18.

Brian and Sheridan begin having recurring dreams of being on the Titanic together, along with a man who looks just like Luis. From afar, the witch Tabitha Lennox (knowing that Sheridan was alive) discovers that Sheridan, Brian, and Luis are three souls forever bound by love, betrayal, and death. Sheridan and Luis, in their various past lives, are torn apart by Brian, with Luis always dying in each successive reincarnation in order to facilitate Brian and Sheridan living happily ever after. This revelation prompts the pair to get engaged. When Sheridan runs up a gambling debt at a casino trying to raise money for her and Brian's wedding, Brian decides to return to his former profession as a racecar driver and win enough money to pay off their debt. Brian manages to win the race, but his car is totaled in the process. While in the hospital recovering from the accident, Brian learns that he is slowly dying, and, at Sheridan's insistence, decides to make an attempt to return home and make amends with his family before passing on.

When he returns home, Brian's true identity is revealed as Luis's long-lost older brother Antonio Lopez-Fitzgerald. Meanwhile, when Sheridan comes face to face with Luis, all of her lost memories return. It is revealed that with Sheridan assumed to be dead, Luis sought comfort from a former girlfriend, Beth Wallace. Luis quickly ends things with Beth, but Sheridan cannot do the same with Antonio. This culminates with her marrying the dying Antonio while sleeping with Luis behind his brother's back.

Beth is furious at being dumped by Luis and Sheridan's selfish behavior. When Sheridan becomes pregnant by one of the two men, Beth decides to take action punish Sheridan. She kidnaps Sheridan while disguised as a clown and holds her prisoner in a pit for several months while preparing to claim her unborn child as her own, reunites with Luis, and convince the town that Sheridan had run away from Harmony.

Sheridan gives birth to a boy, whom Beth passes off as her and Luis's child. She dumps a post-delivery Sheridan into the harbor to drown. However, Charity, who had a vision of Sheridan in the water, tells Luis where she is and he goes to look for her. Death comes to take Luis and Sheridan, but Charity saves them. Sheridan tries to convince Luis of what had happened after she recognizes her son with Beth and realizes that Beth was the clown kidnapper. Sheridan claims that Beth kidnapped her and that Marty (the name given to her son) is her own, but no one believes her. In her quest to reclaim her child and expose Beth for child stealing and kidnapping, Sheridan's adultery with Luis becomes public knowledge. With Alistair's help, a now healthy Antonio has Sheridan imprisoned in the psych ward where she receives electro-shock therapy in order to erase her memories of Luis. Sheridan remains defiant and is ultimately freed from Antonio's grasp when Alistair blows up a plane Antonio is on, in order to kill Luis (who is not on the plane).

Reunited, Sheridan and Luis go to Puerto Arena to visit Luis's estranged youngest sister, Paloma. As a baby, Paloma had been sent away by her mother to be raised by Pilar's sister Maria. Paloma had developed a deep resentment for her family for sending her away as a baby and it took much persuasion to get her to return to her home. Paloma finally agrees to return only if she can take the Wheelers, an American couple who had helped Maria raise her, with her.

Though the Wheelers claim to never have been to Harmony, they seem to be quite familiar with the town and its residents. Luis in particular begins to suspect that "Bob Wheeler" is his long lost father, Martin Fitzgerald, which is ultimately confirmed via a DNA test. When confronted with the evidence, Luis is able to get Bob to confess that he is indeed Martin, but Martin refuses to divulge his exact reasons for leaving. He claims that it was to protect his family.

Several months later, they are finally able to get Mrs. Wheeler to confess her true identity. She is Sheridan's "late" mother Katherine Crane. Alistair, in his youth, had been rejected by the true love of his life: Katherine's sister Rachel Barrett. Rachel died in a freak boating accident, and Alistair married Katherine as a substitute. But when Katherine learned that Alistair never really loved her, and was constantly cheating on her, she tried to leave him. Alistair, however, refused to accept it and began raping and beating her to keep her in line. Martin tried to stand up to Alistair on Katherine's behalf, but Alistair stabbed Martin in the back with a letter opener, causing him to pass out in the Crane living room on the night Sheridan had seen him as a child. Alistair promptly made arrangements to have Martin buried, but Katherine rescued him and the duo stowed away in the middle of the night fearing for their lives. Alistair then faked Katherine's death rather than let it be made public that his wife had abandoned him.

Sheridan wants to bond with her long-lost mother, but Luis wants nothing to do with Katherine or his father, feeling that they took the coward's way out by fleeing Harmony and their loved ones rather than standing up to Alistair Crane. Things are made worse by Sheridan's inability to get Luis to believe her as far as Marty being her biological son and Beth her kidnapper. By the time Sheridan is able to expose Beth, Alistair had moved Beth and Marty out of the country. Sheridan blames Beth's escape on Luis' lack of faith in her and threatens to leave him if he cannot bring back her son. Luis leaves for Europe in order to search for Beth and Marty, leaving Sheridan behind in Harmony. Sheridan tries to keep herself busy by befriending Maureen Preston, a single mother who is terminally ill. When Maureen dies, Sheridan adopts her son when the boy's father, Christopher Boothe, comes to Harmony. Still bitter and resentful towards Luis over his refusal to believe her about Beth and Marty, Sheridan seduces Christopher and seeks to create her own family with his son.

Alistair attempts to further torment Sheridan and the Lopez-Fitzgerald family by having a surgically altered corpse be delivered to Harmony in a coffin, making it appear that Luis is dead. However, Luis returns home alive after the "Passions Vendetta" storyline with the news that Marty and Beth are both dead. By this point, Sheridan is pregnant with Christopher's child, but loses the baby soon after. Meanwhile, the news of her marriage to Christopher causes Luis to give up once and for all on Sheridan, and he begins a relationship with Sheridan's niece, Fancy.

Rivalry with Fancy
Luis leaving her and beginning a relationship with Fancy causes Sheridan to have a mental breakdown. She shuns Chris and his son and becomes determined to destroy Luis and Fancy for falling in love. When Fancy is raped by her half-brother, Vincent Clarkson, Sheridan destroys evidence regarding the rape in order to make Fancy look like a liar. She later testifies against Luis when he is put on trial for several murders that Vincent had committed as the masked "blackmailer". While Fancy fights to clear Luis of the charges against him, Sheridan is willing to protect Vincent when she discovers that he is the masked blackmailer. Vincent nebulously agrees to get Luis released from death row if Sheridan murders Theresa (who is in the way of Vincent's quest to have sex with his step-brother, Ethan Crane-Winthrop), which Sheridan does. She electrocutes Theresa, but the woman survives due to the timely intervention of her nemesis Gwen. Sheridan discovers that Vincent had no intention of honoring his vow to free Luis. However, Sheridan continues to stay silent and protect Vincent, reasoning that she would rather have Luis be dead than with Fancy. Impressed by Sheridan's cold-blooded nature, Vincent agrees to help her find Fancy's evil younger sister, Pretty Crane. Sheridan convinces Pretty to tell Luis that Fancy had disfigured Pretty after a fight over a boy that both girls loved. However, Fancy is able debunk Pretty's claims by revealing that Fancy disfigured Pretty in self-defense, as Pretty had tried to murder Fancy during the fight.

Luis is saved from execution by Endora Lennox and Eve Russell, who out Vincent as the true murderer. In the wake of Vincent's arrest, Sheridan confesses that she knew that Vincent had framed Luis and that she had tried to kill Theresa. Theresa agrees not to press charges, but the revelation is enough to cause Luis to stop loving Sheridan and to choose Fancy over her.

Alistair Crane returns and orders Vincent to kill Sheridan. Alistair is also revealed to have Marty. Sheridan is forced to choose to spare Spike over Vincent when the two are hanging over a cliff. Spike leads Sheridan to Marty. Spike on Alistair's orders, sends both Sheridan and Luis on a wild goose chase searching for Marty before finding him. Meanwhile, Pretty develops a pathological obsession with Luis, causing her to form an uneasy alliance with Sheridan against Fancy and Luis.

Sheridan discovers that Pretty is pregnant with Luis' child, after Alistair forced the pair to have sex. Pretty plans to use this to her advantage to get closer to Luis. Sheridan goes along with Pretty until they take her to the hospital for a checkup and Pretty is revealed to have been faking her pregnancy. Sheridan is just as angry with Pretty as Luis and Fancy are, and demands to know why she would hurt Luis so much while claiming to love him. After the revelation, Sheridan returns to her cottage to discover that Pretty is there, planning to throw acid in Fancy's face. Sheridan lets Pretty go after being treated by the acid herself. In Fancy's room at the Crane mansion, Sheridan is able to knock the acid out of Pretty's hand as she is preparing to throw it. She then reveals to Fancy and Luis that Pretty's scar is also a fake, and watches her niece have a mental breakdown. Sheridan reveals to Luis that Crane women have a history of mental illness, beginning with her grandmother, who went insane and was locked in the attic at the mansion. Sheridan proceeds to ask Luis whether they have a chance to be together ever again. Luis reassures Sheridan that he will always love her, but he is in love with Fancy and plans to marry her. Sheridan decides to accept it and move on.

Sheridan begins to think that she will go insane just like her grandmother, who lost her mind after losing someone she loved. However, at the quad wedding rehearsal Sheridan discovers that Vicki and Vincent are planning on feeding everyone poison mushroom sauce at the rehearsal dinner. Sheridan contemplates allowing only Fancy to eat the toxic sauce, so that she can be with Luis. But Sheridan decides to do the right thing and confronted her nephew and Vick, until they put a gun to her back and threaten to harm Marty if she tells everyone about their plan. Vincent and Vicki lock her in the church closet, where she screams for help. Meanwhile, the rehearsal dinner. She is let out of the closet by Esme and the two are able to hold Vincent and stop Vicki, but this comes too late, as everyone is poisoned. Sheridan tries to get Luis to get up and move, as Eve said that would slow the effects of the poison, but he asks Sheridan to save Fancy and not him, and that she would do it if she really loves him. Sheridan tries to stop Vincent from killing his mother, Eve, but she is forced to eat the poison mushroom sauce by Vicki, and dies. However, Tabitha sacrifices her magic to save everyone.

In the July 23, 2008 episode, Antonio returns to Harmony alive and well. He explains to Sheridan that he was being held captive by Alistair all these years and was only able to escape after the guards stopped getting paid following Alistair's death. Sheridan decides to start a new relationship with Antonio after he convinces her they are soulmates.

Controversy
Sheridan's friendship with Princess Diana came with much controversy because of the manner in which the relationship was handled. Following a car accident, Sheridan made an unexpected recovery following massive injuries and received a visit from her friend Diana, whom Sheridan told, "Thank God I was wearing my seat belt. If only Diana had been wearing hers". The storyline was considered "tasteless, offensive and exploitative", but the show's creator and head writer James E. Reilly considered the decision to include the presence of Diana the "beginning to establish Sheridan's identity".

Awards
2001 Soap Opera Digest Award for Outstanding Heroine

See also
Crane family
Lopez-Fitzgerald family

References

External links 
 soapcentral.com|PS Online
 Sheridan at Soap Central

Passions characters
Female characters in television
Fictional socialites
Fictional female businesspeople
Fictional hoteliers
Television characters introduced in 1999
Fictional characters incorrectly presumed dead